Rockhampton railway station is located on the North Coast line in Queensland, Australia. It serves the city of Rockhampton.

It is the terminus of the electrified section of line from Brisbane. The line north of the station runs along the middle of Denison Street in a single track.

Rockhampton is an important transport hub in the Central Queensland region, providing important transport links between the Central Highlands and Capricorn Coast regions and the areas to the north and south of the state.

Rockhampton was also the junction of the Central Western line and Emu Park line.

In January 2023, public consultation was undertaken to help shape the station's redevelopment.  A new customer lounge and shelters will be built, as well as accessible car parking and improved connectivity to other public transport.

Services
Rockhampton is served by long-distance Traveltrain services the Spirit of Queensland and Spirit of the Outback. It is also the terminus for the Tilt Train service.

Rockhampton was previously served by the Sunshine Express, Sunlander, Queenslander, Spirit of Capricorn and Capricornian  on the North Coast line and Midlander on the Central Western line.

References

External links

Rockhampton station Queensland's Railways on the Internet

Regional railway stations in Queensland
Buildings and structures in Rockhampton
North Coast railway line, Queensland